Chung Yong-jin (born 19 September 1968) is a South Korean billionaire businessman, the vice chairman and former CEO of Shinsegae Group.

Personal life and family 
He is the only son of Lee Myung-hee, chairwoman of Shinsegae Group and grandson of Samsung founder Lee Byung-chul. He is the cousin of Samsung Group chairman Lee Jae-yong and CJ Group chairman Lee Jay-hyun.

He married Go Hyun-jung on 1995, have 2 children - Jung Hae-chan on 2008 and Jung Hae-in on 2000.
They divorced on 2003. He gains custody of all children and share for Go Hyun-jung 1.5 billion Korea Won (in reference to his total assets assume at 30,000 billion Korea Won).

It was announced in 2011 that he would marry Han Ji-hee after his divorce with Go Hyun-jung.

He's known in the South Korean business world to freely communicate with the public via social media.

Education
Chung graduated from Kyungbock High School. He has a Bachelor of Arts in Economics from Brown University.

References

1968 births
Living people
Brown University alumni
South Korean businesspeople
South Korean billionaires
Kyungbock High School alumni
Shinsegae Group
Lee family (South Korea)